Bill Hughes (November 18, 1896 – February 25, 1963) was a baseball player for the Pittsburgh Pirates in 1921. He was a pitcher. He was born on November 18, 1896, in Philadelphia, Pennsylvania, and he died on February 25, 1963, in Birmingham, Alabama. He weighed 155 lbs when playing baseball.

Hughes pitched in 20 minor league baseball seasons for 11 teams, winning 302 minor league games.

References 
Stats

1896 births
1963 deaths
Pittsburgh Pirates players
Major League Baseball pitchers
Baseball players from Pennsylvania
Raleigh Red Birds players
Rochester Tribe players
Sacramento Senators players
Portland Beavers players
Mission Reds players
Little Rock Travelers players
Birmingham Barons players
Durham Bulls players
Durham Bulls managers
Muskogee Reds players
Knoxville Smokies players
Meridian Scrappers players